Elta Kabel (full legal name: ELTA-KABEL d.o.o.) is the biggest cable television and broadband Internet and mobile service provider in Republika Srpska entity and one of  CATV operators in Bosnia and Herzegovina.

Elta Kabel services are available in the following Bosnian 30 cities around BIH:

References

External links
 Official website of ELTA-KABEL (in Russian) (in Bosnian)

Companies of Bosnia and Herzegovina
Communications in Bosnia and Herzegovina
Internet service providers of Bosnia and Herzegovina
Cable television companies